Flying ointment is a hallucinogenic ointment said to have been used by witches in the practice of European witchcraft from at least as far back as the Early Modern period, when detailed recipes for such preparations were first recorded and when their usage spread to colonial North America.

Name
The ointment is known by a wide variety of names, including witches' flying ointment, green ointment, magic salve, or lycanthropic ointment.

Composition 
Francis Bacon (attributed as "Lord Verulam") listed the ingredients of the witches ointment as "the fat of children digged out of their graves, of juices of smallage, wolfe-bane, and cinque foil, mingled with the meal of fine wheat."

Unrelated to Francis' account, poisonous ingredients listed in works on ethnobotany include: belladonna, henbane bell, jimson weed, black henbane, mandrake, hemlock, and/or wolfsbane, most of which contain atropine, hyoscyamine, and/or Scopolamine. Scopolamine can cause psychotropic effects when absorbed transdermally. These tropane alkaloids are classified as deliriants in regards to their psychoactive effects.

Extreme toxicity of active ingredients

With the exception of Potentilla reptans, the plants most frequently recorded as ingredients in Early Modern recipes for flying ointments are extremely toxic and have caused numerous fatalities when eaten, whether by confusion with edible species or in cases of criminal poisoning or suicide. 

The historian, occultist and theosophist Carl Kiesewetter of Meiningen, author of Geschichte des Neueren Occultismus in 1892 and Die Geheimwissenschaften, eine Kulturgeschichte der Esoterik in 1895, was one such casualty.

Bodily flight versus flight in spirit

It has been a subject of discussion between clergymen as to whether witches were able physically to fly to the Sabbath on their brooms with help of the ointment, or whether such 'flight' was explicable in other ways: a delusion created by the Devil in the minds of the witches; the souls of the witches leaving their bodies to fly in spirit to the Sabbath; or a hallucinatory 'trip' facilitated by the entheogenic effects of potent drugs absorbed through the skin. An early proponent of the last explanation was Renaissance scholar and scientist Giambattista della Porta, who not only interviewed users of the flying ointment, but witnessed its effects upon such users at first hand, comparing the deathlike trances he observed in his subjects with their subsequent accounts of the bacchanalian revelry they had 'enjoyed'.

Body in coma and riding on beasts

Dominican churchman Bartolommeo Spina of Pisa gives two accounts of the power of the flying ointment in his Tractatus de strigibus sive maleficis ('Treatise on witches or evildoers') of 1525.
The first concerns an incident in the life of his acquaintance Augustus de Turre of Bergamo, a physician. While studying medicine in Pavia as a young man, Augustus returned late one night to his lodgings (without a key) to find no one awake to let him in. Climbing up to a balcony, he was able to enter through a window, and at once sought out the maidservant, who should have been awake to admit him. On checking her room, however, he found her lying unconscious - beyond rousing - on the floor. The following morning he tried to question her on the matter, but she would only reply that she had been 'on a journey'.

Bartolommeo's second account is more suggestive and points toward another element in the witches' 'flights'. It concerns a certain notary of Lugano who, unable to find his wife one morning, searched for her all over their estate and finally discovered her lying deeply unconscious, naked and dirty with her vagina exposed, in a corner of the pigsty. The notary 'immediately understood that she was a witch' (!) and at first wanted to kill her on the spot, but, thinking better of such rashness, waited until she recovered from her stupor, in order to question her. Terrified by his wrath, the poor woman fell to her knees and confessed that during the night she had 'been on a journey'.

Light is cast on the tale of the notary's wife by two accounts widely separated in time but revealing a persistent theme in European Witchcraft. The first is that of Regino of Prüm whose De synodalibus causis et disciplinis ecclesiasticis libri duo (circa 906 C.E.) speaks of women who 'seduced...by demons...insist that they ride at night on certain beasts [italics not original] together with Diana, goddess of the pagans, and a great multitude of women; that they cover great distances in the silence of the deepest night...' (See also Canon Episcopi).

The second account dates from some 800 years later, coming from Norway in the early 18th century and is the testimony, at the age of thirteen, of one Siri Jørgensdatter. Siri claimed that when she was seven her grandmother had taken her to the witches' sabbath on the mountain meadow Blockula ('blue-hill'): her grandmother led her to a pigsty, where she smeared a sow with some ointment which she took from a horn, whereupon grandmother and granddaughter mounted the animal and, after a short ride through the air, arrived at a building on the Sabbath mountain.

Alleged sexual element in application 

Some sources have claimed that such an ointment would best be absorbed through mucous membranes, and that the traditional image of a female witch astride a broomstick implies the application of flying ointment to the vulva. The passage from the trial for witchcraft in Ireland of Hiberno-Norman noblewoman Alice Kyteler in 1324 quoted above is, while not explicit, certainly open to interpretations both drug-related and sexual. It is also a very early account of such practices, pre-dating by some centuries witch trials in the early modern period. The testimony of Dame Kyteler's maidservant, Petronilla de Meath, while somewhat compromised by having been extracted under torture, contains references not only to her mistress's abilities in the preparation of 'magical' medicines, but also her sexual behaviour, including at least one instance of (alleged) intercourse with a demon.
According to the inquisition ('in which were five knights and numerous nobles') set in motion by Richard de Ledrede, Bishop of Ossory, there was in the city of Kilkenny a band of heretical sorcerers, at the head of whom was Dame Alice Kyteler and against whom no fewer than seven charges relating to witchcraft were laid. The fifth charge is of particular interest in the context of the 'greased staffe' mentioned above:

Possible opiate component

One possible key to how individuals dealt with the toxicity of the nightshades usually said to be part of flying ointments is through the supposed antidotal reaction some of the solanaceous alkaloids have with the alkaloids of Papaver somniferum (opium poppy). This is discussed by Alexander Kuklin in his brief book, How Do Witches Fly? (DNA Press, 1999). This antagonism was claimed to exist by the movement of Eclectic medicine. For instance, King's American Dispensatory states in the entry on belladonna: "Belladonna and opium appear to exert antagonistic influences, especially as regards their action on the brain, the spinal cord, and heart; they have consequently been recommended and employed as antidotes to each other in cases of poisoning" going on to make the extravagant claim that "this matter is now positively and satisfactorily settled; hence in all cases of poisoning by belladonna the great remedy is morphine, and its use may be guided by the degree of pupillary contraction it occasions." The use of opiates in the treatment of belladonna poisoning is, however, strongly contraindicated in modern medical practice [see below].

The synergy between belladonna and poppy alkaloids was made use of in the so-called "twilight sleep" that was provided for women during childbirth beginning in the Edwardian era. Twilight sleep was a mixture of scopolamine, a belladonna alkaloid, and morphine, a Papaver alkaloid, that was injected and which furnished a combination of painkilling and amnesia for a woman in labor. A version is still manufactured for use as the injectable compound Omnopon.

There is no definite indication of the proportions of solanaceous herbs vs. poppy used in flying ointments, and most historical recipes for flying ointment do not include poppy.
Furthermore, a reputable publication by the former UK Ministry of Agriculture, Food and Fisheries (now DEFRA) states specifically that, in cases of poisoning by Atropa belladonna - far from being antidotes - 'Preparations containing morphine or opiates should be avoided as they have a synergic action with atropine'; an appropriate antidote being, by contrast, the acetylcholinesterase inhibitor physostigmine salicylate.

Historical documents 

The first mention of an unguent in relation to a popular belief of orgiastic flying occurs in Roland of Cremona's theological summa, written in the 1230s. The use by witches of flying ointments was first described, according to known sources, by Johannes Hartlieb in 1456. 
It was also described by the Spanish theologian Alfonso Tostado (d. 1455) in Super Genesis Commentaria (printed in Venice, 1507), whose commentary tended to accredit the thesis of the reality of the Witches' Sabbath. In 1477 Antone Rose confessed that the devil gave her a stick 18 inches in length on which she would rub an ointment and with the words "go, in the name of the Devil, go" would fly to the "synagogue" (an alternative name for Sabbath in early witchcraft).

In popular culture

Drama
There is, in the work of the playwright Francisco de Rojas Zorrilla (1607-1648) of Toledo, an exchange concerning the flying ointment, the (following) passage occurring in the play
Lo que quería el Marqués de Villena ('What the Marquis of Villena Wanted').

Literature and film
In Nathaniel Hawthorne's "Young Goodman Brown", Goody Cloyse, after meeting the Devil, says "I was all anointed with the juice of smallage, and cinquefoil, and wolf's bane" to which the Devil replies "[m]ingled with fine wheat and the fat of a new-born babe".
In Mikhail Bulgakov's The Master and Margarita, Margarita, after agreeing to act as hostess at Dr Woland's ball, uses the ointment to become a witch and fly to the estate where the event is being held.
In Clayton Rawson's Death from a Top Hat, two recipes by Johann Weyer, a 16th-century demonologist, are given in a footnote:

1-Water hemlock, sweet flag, cinquefoil, bat's blood, deadly nightshade and oil.
2-Baby's fat, juice of cowbane, aconite, cinquefoil, deadly nightshade and soot.

 In the movie serial Warlock, the villain kills an unbaptised boy to get this "Flying Ointment".
In Jodi Picoult's Salem Falls, a group of four girls practicing witchcraft ingest a flying ointment made of belladonna.
 In the book Calling on Dragons (Book three of the Enchanted Forest Chronicles), the witch Morwen uses a flying potion on a straw basket and a broomstick, not on herself.
 In E. L. Konigsburg's Jennifer, Hecate, Macbeth, William McKinley, and Me, Elizabeth, two characters try to make a flying ointment.
 In the 2015 horror film The Witch, a witch kills an infant child and makes flying ointment out of his corpse.
In the 2016 movie, The Love Witch, the main character applies a flying ointment to her body.
 In the 2019 movie, Portrait of a Lady on Fire, the two main characters apply a flying ointment to their armpits.
 In the 2020 movie, Gretel and Hansel, directed by Oz Perkins, the witch, caressing a precious jar filled with ointment, applies it to herself, and then initiates Gretel into witchcraft by inducing her to do the same.

Music
 The Bonzo Dog Doo-Dah Band song '11 Moustachioed Daughters' - a track on the Album The Doughnut in Granny's Greenhouse - is a darkly comic and surprisingly detailed evocation of the traditional Witches' Sabbath, featuring the flying-ointment-related lines :

 The Swedish symphonic metal band Therion has a song called Unguentum Sabbati (Ointment of the Sabbat) on the album Sitra Ahra.

Gallery

See also
 Besom
 Cunning folk
 Deliriants
 Hedgewitch
 Nightshades
 Witches' Sabbath
 Johannes Hartlieb
 Will Erich Peuckert

References

External links 
 Flying Potions and Getting to the Sabbat
 Belladonna in flying ointments
 Ritual of the Raven
 If Witches No Longer Fly: Today's Pagans and the Solanaceous Plants
 King's American Dispensatory on Belladonna
 FLYING OINTMENTS: Their Ingredients and Their Use
 Witches' Ointment: Information from the Gale Encyclopedia of Occultism & Parapsychology

European witchcraft
Hallucinations
Poisons
Flight folklore
Hyoscyamus